Island Records issued this compilation in 2000 as the first step in a program to re-master and re-issue the albums that Richard and Linda Thompson had cut for them.

The tracks are drawn mostly from the duo's three albums for Island: I Want to See the Bright Lights Tonight, Hokey Pokey and Pour Down Like Silver, though two tracks are taken from Richard Thompson's first solo album Henry the Human Fly; there is also an alternate recording of "A Heart Needs a Home" and a live version of "The Calvary Cross" with an extended guitar solo, both of which originally appeared on the 1976 compilation album (guitar, vocal).

This compilation was released in the UK under the name The End of the Rainbow: an introduction to Richard & Linda Thompson with an identical track listing and similar artwork.

Track listing
All songs written by Richard Thompson
"Roll Over Vaughan Williams"
"The Poor Ditching Boy"
"When I Get to the Border"
"Withered and Died"
"I Want to See the Bright Lights Tonight"
"Down Where the Drunkards Roll"
"The End of the Rainbow"
"The Great Valerio"
"Hokey Pokey"
"Never Again"
"A Heart Needs a Home"
"For Shame of Doing Wrong"
"Night Comes In"
"Beat the Retreat"
"Dimming of the Day"
"The Calvary Cross"

References 

2000 compilation albums
Richard and Linda Thompson albums
Island Records compilation albums